Catoptria spodiellus is a moth in the family Crambidae. It was described by Rebel in 1916. It is found in Russia (Tuva, Transbaikalia).

References

Crambini
Moths described in 1916
Moths of Asia